Samuel Schieff is a male former Polish and Israeli international table tennis player.

He won a bronze medal at the 1936 World Table Tennis Championships in the Swaythling Cup (men's team event) with Alojzy Ehrlich and Shimcha Finkelstein for Poland.

He was ranked Polish number one in the mid-1930s. He was of Jewish origin and following the war represented Israel, alongside his former teammate Finkelstein in the World Championships.

See also
 List of table tennis players
 List of World Table Tennis Championships medalists

References

Polish male table tennis players
Israeli table tennis players
Jewish table tennis players
20th-century Polish Jews
World Table Tennis Championships medalists